De Mortel is a village in the Dutch province of North Brabant. It is located in the municipality of Gemert-Bakel.

History 
The village was first mentioned in 1408 as "in den mortel", and means "low lying muddy place". De Mortel developed as an agricultural community in the 14th century to the south of Gemert, and is centred around a triangular square on which later a church was built.

The Catholic St Antonius Abt Church is a three aisled basilica-like church built between 1902 and 1904 as a replacement of the 1848 church.

The tower was constructed between 1989 and 1990. It is used as a microwave transmitter and by several radio stations. The tower is also home to a family of peregrine falcons. The falcons first appeared in 2004. In 2005, a bird house was built on top of the tower and web-cams have been installed to follow the birds.

De Mortel was home to 165 people in 1840.

Gallery

References 

Populated places in North Brabant
Gemert-Bakel